John Nicholas Pyecha (born November 25, 1931) is an American former professional baseball player.

On April 24, 1954, at Crosley Field, Pyecha entered the game in relief of Warren Hacker in the seventh inning with his Cubs trailing the Cincinnati Redlegs 3–2. Pyecha held the Redlegs off the scoreboard in the seventh and eighth innings; meanwhile, Chicago rallied to take a 5–3 lead thanks to home runs by Ralph Kiner and Hank Sauer. Pyecha started the last half of the ninth inning by issuing a walk to Gus Bell, then retired Jim Greengrass and Ted Kluszewski to get within one out of the victory. But Johnny Temple singled to bring the winning run to the plate, and Wally Post hit a three-run walk-off home run to win the game for the Redlegs. In his lone MLB game, Pyecha allowed three runs, all earned, on four hits and two bases on balls, with two strikeouts, in 2⅔ innings pitched.

Pyecha spent the remainder of 1954 with the Los Angeles Angels of the Pacific Coast League, and retired after the 1955 season having pitched in 154 minor league games.

References

External links

1931 births
Living people
Appalachian State Mountaineers baseball players
Baseball players from Pennsylvania
Chicago Cubs players
Elkin Blanketeers players
Greensboro Patriots players
Los Angeles Angels (minor league) players
Macon Peaches players
Major League Baseball pitchers
People from Aliquippa, Pennsylvania
Springfield Cubs players
Rutherford County Owls players